The 2018 season was Lillestrøm's 42nd consecutive year in Eliteserien.

Season events
On 26 June, Arne Erlandsen was sacked as the club manager, with Arild Sundgot being appointed as an interim manager. On 13 July, Jörgen Lennartsson was appointed the club's new manager.

Squad

Out on loan

Transfers

Winter

In:

Out:

Summer

In:

Out:

Competitions

Mesterfinalen

Eliteserien

Results summary

Results by round

Results

Table

Norwegian Cup

Europa League

Qualifying phase

Squad statistics

Appearances and goals

|-
|colspan="14"|Players away from Lillestrøm on loan:

|-
|colspan="14"|Players who left Lillestrøm during the season:
|}

Goal scorers

Disciplinary record

References

Lillestrøm SK seasons
Lillestrom
Lillestrom